Jessica Care Moore (born October 28, 1971) is an American poet. She is the CEO of Moore Black Press, executive producer of BLACK WOMEN ROCK!, and founder of the literacy-driven jess Care moore Foundation. An internationally renowned poet, playwright, performance artist and producer, she is the recipient of the 2013 Alain Locke Award from the Detroit Institute of Arts.

Moore is the author of The Words Don’t Fit in My Mouth, The Alphabet Verses The Ghetto, God is Not an American, Sunlight Through Bullet Holes and We Want Our Bodies Back.  Her poetry has been heard on stages including Carnegie Hall, Lincoln Center and the London Institute of Contemporary Arts.

Early career
Born in Detroit, Michigan, Jessica Care Moore first came to national prominence when she won the "It’s Showtime at the Apollo" competition a record-breaking five times in a row. Her performance of the poem "Black Statue of Liberty" earned her several meetings with high-profile publishing companies. In 1997, she launched a publishing company of her own, Moore Black Press.

Her first book, The Words Don’t Fit In My Mouth, sold more than 20,000 copies. Along with her own work, she also published poets such as Saul Williams, Shariff Simmons, Def Poetry Jam's co-founder Danny Simmons, NBA player Etan Thomas, Ras Baraka and former Essence Magazine editor Asha Bandele.

Writing
Moore's work has been published in several literary collections, including 44 on 44 (Third World Press, 2011); A Different Image (U of D Mercy Press, 2004); Abandon Automobile (WSU Press, 2001); Listen Up! (Random House, 1999); Step Into A World (Wiley Publishing, 2001); Role Call (Third World Press, 2002); and Bum Rush The Page: A Def Poetry Jam (Crown Publishing, 2001). She is the youngest poet published in the Prentice Hall Anthology of African American Women’s Literature by Valerie Lee, alongside literary greats such as Zora Neale Hurston, Alice Walker, Octavia Butler, and Maya Angelou.

Moore has appeared on the cover of The New York Times, The Metro Times, Michigan FrontPage, Detroit News, Detroit Free Press, African Voices Magazine, and Black Elegance Magazine. She has been featured in print and online magazines across the world, including Essence, Huffington Post, Blaze, The Source, Vibe, Bomb, Mosaic, Savoy, One World, Upscale, Ambassador Magazine and UPTOWN.

Her multimedia show, God is Not an American, was produced by The Apollo Theater and Time Warner's NYC Parks Summer Concert Series. She was the host, writer and co-executive producer of the poetry-driven television show Spoken, which was executive produced by and directed by Robert Townsend and aired on The Black Family Channel.

In February 2017, Moore staged the afrofuturistic, techno-inspired choreopoem Salt City, directed by Aku Kadogo. It was performed again in June 2019 at the Charles H. Wright Museum in Detroit, co-directed with Kadogo and Marlies Yearby.

Her work is featured at the Smithsonian National Museum of African American History and Culture.

Hip hop contributions
Moore's poetry is featured on Nas’ Nastradamus album, Jeezy's Church in These Streets, and Talib Kweli’s Attack The Block mix tape. She is a returning star of Russell Simmons’ HBO series Def Poetry Jam. She is also featured on the Silent Poets track This Is Not An Instrumental.

Music projects

Jessica Care Moore's techno solo theatre performance The Missing Project: Pieces of the D is a high-energy homage to Detroit. She continued to push the boundaries of the genre by producing her first conceptual art installation, NANOC: I Sing The Body Electric, which opened at the Dell Pryor Gallery in 2011. Her work was on exhibit at the American Jazz Museum in Kansas City and the Charles H. Wright Museum through August 2014 for her Black WOMEN Rock! Exhibition.

Her debut album, Black Tea: The Legend of Jessi James, was released in fall of 2014 and produced via Javotti Media. The album features guest appearances from Talib Kweli, Roy Ayers and Jose James.

Jessica Care Moore was featured on a spoken word album "Eargasms".

Activism
As an artist and activist, Moore used her voice for the international fight against AIDS. She performed for the United Nations World AIDS Day Commemoration two years in a row and was one of the organizers of Hip-Hop-A-Thon, a concert in San Francisco, which helped increase AIDS education in the Bay Area's Black and Latino communities. Moore has also performed in front of thousands of people during AIDS WALK Opening Ceremonies in New York City, San Francisco, Los Angeles, Florida, and Atlanta.

Personal life
Jessica Care Moore lives, writes, and plays in downtown Detroit.

References

External links
 

American women poets
20th-century American poets
21st-century American poets
African-American poets
Slam poets
American spoken word artists
African-American women musicians
20th-century American women writers
21st-century American women writers
20th-century African-American writers
21st-century African-American writers
Writers from Detroit
HIV/AIDS activists
20th-century African-American women writers
21st-century African-American women writers
1971 births
Living people